The Lake Oswego Railroad Bridge (also known as the Union Pacific Railroad Bridge at Lake Oswego and formerly as the Southern Pacific Railroad Bridge at Lake Oswego) is a truss railroad bridge that spans the Willamette River between Lake Oswego, Oregon and Oak Grove, Oregon. Owned by the Union Pacific Railroad, it is currently leased by the Portland and Western Railroad.

History
The bridge was built in 1910 by the Southern Pacific Company, in response to the desires of Portland city planners for an eastside railway bypass to keep rail traffic out of downtown Portland. With its acquisition of Southern Pacific in 1996, Union Pacific Railroad assumed ownership of the bridge. Currently, the bridge is operated by the Portland and Western Railroad under a lease from Union Pacific.

Description
On the west (Lake Oswego) side, there is a  deck plate girder approach span that was built in 1900 and moved to this location in 1931. In 1934, a  open-deck trestle was built on this side of the river. Holding the railway deck across the river are two  through truss spans. Completing the bridge on the east side in Oak Grove is a  open-deck trestle.

Usage
Though the bridge is now used exclusively for active freight rail transport, some Portland-area commuters have urged that the bridge be modified to allow commuter rail or bicycle traffic.

References

See also
 List of crossings of the Willamette River

Railroad bridges in Oregon
Bridges completed in 1910
Lake Oswego, Oregon
Union Pacific Railroad bridges
Bridges in Clackamas County, Oregon
Bridges over the Willamette River
Truss bridges in the United States
Southern Pacific Railroad
1910 establishments in Oregon
Metal bridges in the United States